Discocactus is a genus of tropical cacti. The name comes from the ancient Greek  (=disc) because of its shape. Discocactus plants are endemic to southern Brazil, eastern Bolivia, and northern Paraguay. These species are in the risk of extinction in the wild.

Description
The plants have a slightly flattened spherical shape. The areoles bear sharp spines. At the apex of the adult plants, there is a wooly cephalium, white or shaded with yellow or grey. The white nocturnal flowers appear on the sides of the cephalium. The fruits are pink or red and contain black seeds.

Species
All species are listed under Appendix I of CITES meaning commercial international trade is prohibited and non-commercial international trade is regulated.

References

Bibliography 
 Edward F. Anderson : The Cactus Family. Timber Press: Portland (Oregon), 2001, p. 218-221 
 N. L. Britton, J. N. Rose: The Cactaceae. Descriptions and Illustrations of Plants of the Cactus Family. Washington, 1920

External links 

  photos on www.AIAPS.org
  photos on www.cactiguide.com

 
Trichocereeae
Cacti of South America
Flora of Brazil
Flora of Bolivia
Flora of Paraguay
Cactoideae genera